"All Tomorrow's Parties" is a song by The Velvet Underground

All Tomorrow's Parties may also refer to:

 "All Tomorrow's Parties" (Grey's Anatomy), an episode of the TV series Grey's Anatomy
 All Tomorrow's Parties (festival), an annual festival in England
 All Tomorrow's Parties (2009 film), a documentary about the music festival
 All Tomorrow's Parties (2003 film), a Chinese film
 All Tomorrow's Parties (novel), a novel by William Gibson
 "All Tomorrow's Parties" (One Tree Hill episode), an episode of the TV series One Tree Hill
 "All Tomorrow's Parties", fifth episode of the U.S. TV series The Tomorrow People

See also
 All Tomorrows